The Arboretum de l'Hermet is an arboretum located at an altitude of 1000 metres, about 6 km east of Riotord, Haute-Loire, Auvergne, France. The arboretum was established in 1998 and contains introduced species such as giant sequoias, American red oak, Japanese larch, spruce, and fir.

See also 
 List of botanical gardens in France

References 
 Office de Tourisme du pays de Montfaucon en Velay : Arboretum
 La Haute-Loire à pied, à cheval, en VTT ou à vélo, page 12
 Bois Foret article (French)

Hermet, Arboretum de l'
Hermet, Arboretum de l'